Buford is an unincorporated community in Pittsylvania County, in the U.S. state of Virginia. It is mentioned in the Beale ciphers.

References

Unincorporated communities in Virginia
Unincorporated communities in Pittsylvania County, Virginia